Dakota Floeter is an American actor and rock musician, born August 2, 1994, in Los Angeles, California. In addition to Dakota's acting roles in television and film, he has played guitar in television commercials for Folgers (2000), Fender Guitars and Hewlett-Packard (2004), and on television's Austin City Limits.

Music
Dakota performs on guitar and vocals in the teenage rock band Life With An Astronaut. In 2006, popular UK music magazine, NME labeled Dakota "the world's most talented 11 year old." In 2007, Swindle Magazine called Dakota a "12-year-old musical prodigy.".

Filmography
iCarly (2007), as Guitarist
Boomtown (2003), as Young Wally
The Failures (2003), as Young William
The Guardian (2003), as Oscar Dohanic
MDs (2002), as Mac Kellerman
Austin City Limits (2001), as himself
ER (1994–1995), as Baby

References

External links

Official Life With An Astronaut MySpace Profile

American male child actors
American rock musicians
1994 births
Living people